Habitancum was an ancient Roman fort (castrum) located at Risingham, Northumberland, England. The fort was one of the defensive structures built along Dere Street, a Roman road running from York to Corbridge and onwards to Melrose in what is now Scotland.

The fort's name is from Habitanci on an altar set up by Marcus Gavius Secundinus, a consular beneficiary on duty there. It is not mentioned in other sources such as the Notitia Dignitatum. Evidensca in the Ravenna Cosmography is highly unlikely to be a corrupted version of this name.

Location
It is west of the A68 road between Corbridge and Jedburgh, where the road crosses the River Rede at the village of West Woodburn. At this point Dere Street deviates westwards of the A68 and rejoins it a mile or two further north.

Description
The fort occupies a low mound overlooking the River Rede. It was surrounded by a number of ditches, which can still be seen on the south and west sides.

The fort had gates in the south and west walls. There may have been gates in the other walls but no sign of them has been found. The walls were of sandstone ashlar, backed by a clay bank thirty feet thick.

At the end of the 2nd century the fort was either abandoned or destroyed when large numbers of Roman troops were withdrawn. Later, the fort was rebuilt by the First Cohort of Vangiones, one thousand strong.

Garrison
The 2nd-century garrison is not known for certain, but may have been Cohors IV Gallorum equitata. The 3rd-century garrison was the First Cohort of Vangiones, as well as a Numerus Exploratorum (Unit of Scouts) and a detachment of Raeti Gaesati (pikemen).

Current site
The only visible stone remains lie at the north-eastern corner angle, but the outlines of many buildings can easily be made out beneath a layer of turf in the fort's interior, as can the ditches on all sides.

References
 J. Collingwood Bruce, Roman Wall (1863), Harold Hill & Son, 
 Frank Graham, The Roman Wall, Comprehensive History and Guide (1979), Frank Graham, 
HABITANCVM Roman Fort and Marching Camps

External links

HABITANCVM Roman Fort and Marching Camps

Roman fortifications in England
Military history of Northumberland
Roman sites in Northumberland